Yoko! Jakamoko! Toto! is an animated children's television series, produced by Collingwood O'Hare Productions Limited for HIT Entertainment and currently distributed by Foothill Entertainment, which aired from 2 June 2003 till 29 August 2005 on CITV, Playhouse Disney in 30 August 2005 till 25 January 2009, and then aired on CBeebies from 26 January 2009.

Plot
The television series is about a bird-of-paradise, an armadillo, and a spider monkey who live and go on adventures in the wilderness where they all live and can only communicate by saying each other's names.

Broadcast
An animated short film from the series made its American debut on 2 June 2003 as part of the New York International Children's Film Festival.

The show has aired on ABC in Australia (as well as its digital networks ABC Kids and ABC 2) from 24 February 2003 to 27 November 2006, TVOKids in Canada, Kids Central in Singapore, ATV in Hong Kong, e-Junior in the U.A.E., TBS in Japan, MiniMini in Poland, Super3 in Spain, Canal Once in Mexico, Super RTL in Germany, Pakapaka in Argentina, ETTV in Taiwan, SVT in Sweden, NRK1 in Norway, RTP2 in Portugal, Piwi in France and Cartoon Network (in the former Tickle-U block) in the US. Unlike most animated series, when the show was sold to several countries that don't speak English and have English as their first language it was never dubbed or translated into different languages or redubbed with a different range of voices as the characters in the show only had limited dialogue and can only communicate by saying anybody's names making all the voices retained and left alone.

Development
While the series was in production, the distribution was done by Gullane Entertainment (formally known as The Britt Allcroft Company, the company that made Thomas the Tank Engine and Friends) up until July 2002, when the company was bought by HIT Entertainment.

Awards
Yoko! Jakamoko! Toto! has won numerous industry awards including Best Pilot at the Annecy International Festival of Animation, Best Writer at the British Animation Awards and two British Academy Children's Awards, including Best Writer and Best Pre-School Animation.

UK Voice Cast
 Alex Kelly - Yoko the Bird of Paradise
 Gary Martin - Jakamoko the Armadillo
 Rob Rackstraw - Toto the Spider Monkey
 Alistair McGowan, Kate Harbour, Moya O'Shea, Alan Marriott, Colin McFarlane and Maria Darling - additional voices

Episode listing
56 5-minute-long episodes were produced. Every episode title starts with "The", much like The Amazing World of Gumball, Wander Over Yonder, and Igloo Gloo.

Season 1 (2003-2005)
 1. The Special Thing/The Scary Monster/The Water-Hole/The Patient
 2. The Whale/The Night/The Shell/The Very Sticky Thing
 3. The Fly/The Egg/The Blip/The Visit
 4. The Naughty Noise/The New Best Friend/The Girlfriend/The Cave
 5. The Other Side/The Longest Day/The Lesson/The Song
 6. The Meal/The Windy Day/The Hiccups/The Copycat
 7. The New King/The Other Monkey/The Nightmare/The Oyster
 8. The Smell/The Babysitters/The Seeds/The Traveller
 9. The Hole/The Rival/The Island/The Voice
 10. The Beetle/The Coconut/The Puzzle/The Late Night
 11. The Sand/The Leaf/The Dreamers/The Migration
 12. The Tallest/The Snow/The Log/The Contest
 13. The Meerkats/The Mango/The Bad Word/The In-Crowd
 14. The Butterfly/The Dance/The Chicken/The Show

References

External links
 
 

CBeebies
2000s British animated television series
2000s British children's television series
2003 British television series debuts
2005 British television series endings
British children's animated adventure television series
BAFTA winners (television series)
TBS Television (Japan) original programming
ITV children's television shows
BBC children's television shows
British preschool education television series
Television series by Mattel Creations
English-language television shows